Maaike de Waard (born 11 October 1996) is a Dutch competitive swimmer who specializes in backstroke and butterfly events.  She competed in the women's 50 metre backstroke event at the 2017 World Aquatics Championships.

Personal bests

References

External links
 

1996 births
Living people
Dutch female backstroke swimmers
Dutch female butterfly swimmers
Dutch female freestyle swimmers
People from Rozenburg
Swimmers at the 2014 Summer Youth Olympics
Youth Olympic gold medalists for the Netherlands
European Aquatics Championships medalists in swimming
Swimmers at the 2020 Summer Olympics
Olympic swimmers of the Netherlands
Medalists at the FINA World Swimming Championships (25 m)
Sportspeople from South Holland
21st-century Dutch women